Invision or InVision may refer to:

 Invision Agency, an entertainment company part owned by The Associated Press
 Invision Community, an Internet community software produced by Invision Power Services
 Invision Private Equity, owners of Swiss Education Group
 Invision Studios, a film production company based in Harare, Zimbabwe
 InVision Technologies, a manufacturer of airport security screening devices to detect explosives in baggage
 Invision (software), a web-based prototyping tool